Rustai-ye Bandku (also Romanized as Rūstāī-ye Bandkū; also known as Bandkūh) is a village in Deh Kahan Rural District, Aseminun District, Manujan County, Kerman Province, Iran. At the 2006 census, its population was 590, in 130 families.

References 

Populated places in Manujan County